Robotic expressionism is an artistic theory that was formulated in 2012 by roboticists in the San Francisco Bay Area. The originators of the theory, Joshua Price and Zoie MacDougall, demonstrated robotic expressionism in practice for the first time at the 2012 International RoboGames in a competition to create a robot artist. As opposed to the traditional forms of precision and randomized robotic artwork, robotic expressionists embraces the "mood" of the robot – the state of its environment, internal stresses, battery level, and other factors – to create an art piece with creative contributions from both the human roboticist and the robot painter.

Origins
While robotic expressionism may have existed in undocumented forms before them, Price and MacDougall are credited with being the first roboticists to publicly display art that aligned with the theory of robotic expressionism. They began work on their first robot artist, named RobART, in the Spring of 2012. RobART was composed primarily of VEX Robotics components and had several appendages holding paint brushes, foam brushes, a foam stamp, and spray paint cans. RobART painted on the ground and moved around on its paintings with twelve wheels; it was programmed using the RobotC language.

Price and MacDougall entered RobART into the ArtBot – Paint category 2012 International RoboGames competition, which is hosted in annually in San Mateo, California. Robogames is the world's largest adult robotics competition and is often called the "Olympics of robots". RobART painted several pieces live for audiences at the competition. All of the robot's paintings were abstract takes on a polluted cityscape, the most well-known titled City No. 3. Price and MacDougall were awarded the gold medal in the ArtBot – Paint category for their work.

Price and MacDougall were subsequently invited to the Dublin branch of the Alameda County Library to demonstrate RobART in action. The library then put one of RobART's paintings – titled City No. 4 – on public display as an innovative art piece.

Theory
The theory of robotic expressionism involves concepts of programming, mechanical devices, and art theory. A primary concern in programming physical machines is keeping movement error within a certain tolerance; much research has gone into controlling physical devices to be precise when following directions. Robotic expressionists abandon this notion of robotic precision and embrace the intrinsic unpredictability in the movement on machines. By allowing for physical variability, robotic expressionists are able to explore the robot's "mood". Some of the largest contributors to a robot's mood are its battery power, the strength of its motors, the temperature of its environment, its internal structure, and the material of the surface on which it moves.

The interaction between human ideas and robot mood are central to the theory of robotic expressionism. The human gives the robot a program, which for the purpose of robotic expressionism can be considered an idea or a suggestion. The robot then reads the program and follows it based on its mood; a robot's mood is different each time it paints, so it will create a different work of art even when following the same program.

References

Theories